Nanortalik Municipality was a municipality in south Greenland, a sub-division of the Kujalleq municipality.

Towns and settlements

Nanortalik area 
 Nanortalik (Nennortalik)
 Aappilattoq
 Alluitsup Paa (Sydprøven)
 Ammassivik (Sletten)
 Narsarmijit (Frederiksdal, Narsaq Kujalleq)
 Tasiusaq
 Qorlortorsuaq

References 

Former municipalities of Greenland